Hensley is a census-designated place (CDP) in Pulaski County, Arkansas, United States. The population was 139 at the 2010 census. It is part of the Little Rock–North Little Rock–Conway Metropolitan Statistical Area.

History
Founded on January 27, 1882, the settlement is named for William B. Hensley, a 19th-century landowner and veteran of the American Civil War.

Geography
Hensley is located at  (34.504317, -92.204253).

Demographics

2020 census

Note: the US Census treats Hispanic/Latino as an ethnic category. This table excludes Latinos from the racial categories and assigns them to a separate category. Hispanics/Latinos can be of any race.

2000 census
As of the census of 2000, there were 150 people, 59 households, and 38 families residing in the CDP. The racial makeup of the CDP was 34.00% White, 64.67% Black or African American, and 1.33% from two or more races.

There were 59 households, out of which 23.7% had children under the age of 18 living with them, 39.0% were married couples living together, 20.3% had a female householder with no husband present, and 33.9% were non-families. 32.2% of all households were made up of individuals, and 15.3% had someone living alone who was 65 years of age or older. The average household size was 2.54 and the average family size was 3.21.

In the CDP, the population was spread out, with 20.0% under the age of 18, 8.7% from 18 to 24, 32.0% from 25 to 44, 22.7% from 45 to 64, and 16.7% who were 65 years of age or older. The median age was 40 years. For every 100 females, there were 87.5 males. For every 100 females age 18 and over, there were 87.5 males.

The median income for a household in the CDP was $26,607, and the median income for a family was $29,286. Males had a median income of $15,417 versus $21,875 for females. The per capita income for the CDP was $10,878. There were 21.4% of families and 21.2% of the population living below the poverty line, including no under eighteens and 29.0% of those over 64.

Education
It is within the Pulaski County Special School District. It is zoned to Daisy Bates Elementary School, Fuller Middle School, and Wilbur D. Mills University Studies High School.

Notable residents
 Andy Mayberry (born 1970), American politician
 Julie Mayberry (born ), American politician

See also 
 List of places named after people in the United States

References

External links

 
 Redfield Library at the Pine Bluff and Jefferson County Library System
 

1882 establishments in Arkansas
Census-designated places in Arkansas
Census-designated places in Little Rock–North Little Rock–Conway metropolitan area
Census-designated places in Pulaski County, Arkansas
Populated places established in 1882